Taofeek Ajibade Ismaheel (born 16 July 2000) is a Nigerian professional footballer who plays as a striker for Belgian club Beveren, on loan from French club Lorient.

Career
Ismaheel started his career with Norwegian second tier side Skeid, where he suffered relegation to the Norwegian third tier. Before the second half of 2021–22, Ismaheel signed for Lorient in the Ligue 1.  Before the 2022 season, he was sent on loan to Norwegian club Vålerenga. On 2 April 2022, he debuted for Vålerenga in a 1–0 loss to Molde.

On 10 August 2022, Ismaheel moved on loan to Beveren in the Belgian second tier.

References

External links
 
 

2000 births
Living people
Nigerian footballers
Association football forwards
Eliteserien players
Norwegian First Division players
Norwegian Second Division players
Challenger Pro League players
FC Lorient players
Fredrikstad FK players
K.S.K. Beveren players
Skeid Fotball players
Vålerenga Fotball players
S.K. Beveren players
Nigerian expatriate footballers
Nigerian expatriate sportspeople in Belgium
Expatriate footballers in Belgium
Nigerian expatriate sportspeople in France
Expatriate footballers in France
Nigerian expatriate sportspeople in Norway
Expatriate footballers in Norway